Dave Murzin (born December 24, 1963) is a realtor and former Republican member of the Florida House of Representatives. He was born in Louisville, Kentucky.

Biography
Murzin's father, a retired Navy captain and dentist, moved the family to Pensacola in 1978. Dave graduated from Tate High School and received an Associate of Arts Degree from Pensacola Junior College. He also received a bachelor's degree in Political Science with a minor in Economics from the University of West Florida, and began work in educational leadership. He is pursuing a master's degree in Educational Leadership. While working on his bachelor's degree at UWF, Murzin was the Director of the Campus Alcohol and Drug Information Center. He also worked in the Student Activities Office and for the City of Pensacola. He has a son.

Murzin was elected to the State House in the 2nd districted from November 5, 2002, to November 2, 2010, and worked on health care, energy, and tax reform. He is affiliated with the American Legislative Exchange Council's Telecommunications & Information Technology Task Force.

References

External links
Florida House of Representatives - Dave Murzin

1963 births
Living people
Republican Party members of the Florida House of Representatives
Politicians from Louisville, Kentucky
American Lutherans
Pensacola Junior College alumni
University of West Florida alumni
People from Pensacola, Florida